Tomás Nistal may refer to:
Tomás Nistal (cyclist) (born 1948), Spanish cyclist
Tomás Nistal (footballer) (born 1960), Spanish footballer